Meg-John Barker (born 23 June 1974) is a writer, writing mentor, creative consultant, speaker, and independent scholar. They have written a number of anti self-help books on the topics of relationships, sex, and gender, as well as the graphic non-fiction books, Queer: A Graphic History and Gender: A Graphic Guide, and the book The Psychology of Sex. They are the writer of the relationships book and blog Rewriting the Rules, and they have a podcast with sex educator Justin Hancock.

Barker is a full-time writer, as well as being a writing mentor, creative consultant, speaker, and independent scholar. Barker holds a PhD in Psychology from the University of Nottingham, and worked for two decades as an academic psychologist at the Open University in the United Kingdom, and as a psychotherapist specialising in sex, gender, and relationships.

Barker has written and/or edited some of the first academic collections on open non-monogamy, bisexuality, non-binary gender and BDSM. They were editor of the journal Psychology & Sexuality from 2010 to 2017, and lead author of The Bisexuality Report and the BACP document on Gender, Sexual, and Relationship Diversity.

Barker's pronouns are singular they/them.

Early life and education
Barker was born in Hull, England, on 23 June 1974, grew up in Bradford,  and  holds a PhD in Psychology from the University of Nottingham. After teaching at  a number of higher education institutions, Barker settled at the Open University in 2008, having also qualified with an MA in Psychotherapy from the University of Sheffield and trained at the major NHS sexual and relationship clinic at Guy's Hospital for several years.

Recent career
Barker's   main area of expertise is human sexuality, gender and romantic relationships, with a focus on the experiences of people in sexual, gender and relationship communities located outside the mainstream – particularly polyamorous, kink, non-binary and bisexual communities. Theoretically their work draws on social constructionism, existentialism and Buddhist philosophy. Barker, with co-author Darren Langdridge, has published two edited collections on sadomasochism and on non-monogamy,  and a recent book for mental health professionals (co-authored with Christina Richards). Barker founded the journal of Psychology & Sexuality together with Langdridge in 2010, and they co-edited it until 2017. Barker co-organized the Critical Sexology series from 2006 to 2018, and BiReCon (a biennial research conference which takes place prior to the annual BiCon event).

Writing
Barker coined the phrase ‘anti self-help’ to describe self-help materials which locate the struggles that people have in their wider societal structures and cultural messages rather than in them as individuals. Barker's anti self-help books aim to help people to navigate their relationship with wider sociocultural understandings, rather than viewing themselves as a problem that needs fixing. They have produced books applying this approach to relationships, sex (with Justin Hancock), and gender (with Alex Iantaffi), as well as producing graphic-novel style non-fiction books and zines on queer, mindfulness and other topics, and a podcast on sex and relationships.

Consulting
Barker has a background in psychotherapy, and led production on the Open University module Counselling: Exploring Fear and Sadness. They are trained in existential psychotherapy and mindfulness with books on the latter developing the approaches of social mindfulness and mindful sex and relationship therapy (MSRT). Their practice now takes the form of peer-to-peer consulting and mentoring with writers, practitioners, activists, and organizers, with a focus on relationships with self, others, and the wider world.

Activism
Barker's activism in the area of LGBT&Q rights has been recognized by placement in the top 40 of The Independent on Sunday newspaper's Pink List, and Rainbow List.  Barker was one of the founder members of BiUK, the organization for bisexual research and activism. This group wrote the international guidelines for academics studying bisexuality (published in Journal of Bisexuality) and produced The Bisexuality Report which informs UK policy and practice regarding bisexuality based on the evidence regarding biphobia, bisexual invisibility, and mental health In 2013, Barker took home an Erotic Award in the academic category for the book Rewriting the Rules, as reported in Times Higher Education. Their current activism focuses on trans and non-binary communities.

Works

Books (as author)
 Barker, M. (2003) Introductory Psychology: History, Themes and Perspectives. Exeter: Learning Matters Ltd. 
 Richards, C & Barker, M. (2013) Sexuality and Gender for Counsellors, Psychologists and Health Professionals: A Practical Guide. London: Sage. 
 Barker, M. (2013) Mindfulness in Counselling & Psychotherapy: Practising Mindfully Across Approaches and Issues. London: Sage. 
 Barker, M.-J. & Gabb, J. (2016) The Secrets of Enduring Love: How to Make Relationships Last. London: Penguin RandomHouse. 
 Barker, M.-J. & Scheele, J. (2016) Queer: A Graphic History. London: Icon Books. 
 Barker, M.-J. & Hancock, J. (2017) Enjoy Sex (How, When and If You Want To): A Practical and Inclusive Guide. London: Icon Books. 
 Iantaffi, A. & Barker, M.-J. (2017) How to Understand Your Gender: A Practical Guide for Exploring Who You Are. London: Jessica Kingsley. 
 Barker, M.-J. (2018) Rewriting the Rules: An Anti Self-help Guide to Love, Sex and Relationships. Second edition. London: Routledge. 
 Barker, M.-J. (2018) The Psychology of Sex. London: Routledge 
 Barker, M.-J., Gill, R. & Harvey, L. (2018) Mediated Intimacy: Sex Advice in Media Culture. London: Polity. 
 Barker, M.-J. & Iantaffi, A. (2019) Life Isn't Binary: On Being Both, Beyond, and In-Between. London: Jessica Kingsley. 
 Barker, M.-J. & Scheele, J. (2019) Gender: A Graphic Guide. London: Icon Books.

Books (as editor)
 Langdridge, D. & Barker M. (2007) Safe, Sane and Consensual: Contemporary Perspectives on Sadomasochism, Basingstoke: Palgrave Macmillan. 
 Barker, M., Vossler, A. & Langdridge, D. (Eds.) (2010) Understanding Counselling and Psychotherapy. London: Sage. 
 Langdridge, D. & Barker M. (Eds.) (2010) Understanding Non-monogamies. New York: Routledge. 
 Brotto, L. & Barker, M. (Eds.) (2014) Mindfulness in Sexual and Relationship Therapy. Abingdon: Taylor & Francis. 
 Richards, C. & Barker, M. (Eds.) (2015) The Palgrave Handbook of the Psychology of Sexuality & Gender. Basingstoke: Palgrave Macmillan. 
 Vossler, A., Havard, C., Pike, G. Barker, M.-J. & Raabe, B. (Eds.) (2017) Mad or Bad? A Critical Approach to Counselling and Forensic Psychology. London: Sage. 
 Richards, C., Bouman, W. & Barker, M.-J. (Eds.) (2018) Genderqueer and Non-Binary Genders. Basingstoke: Palgrave Macmillan.

Reports
 Barker, M., Richards, C., Jones, R., Bowes-Catton, H., & Plowman, T. (2012). The Bisexuality Report: Bisexual Inclusion in LGBT equality and diversity. Milton Keynes: The Open University, Centre for Citizenship, Identity and Governance. 
 Shaw, L., Butler, C. Langdridge, D., Gibson, S., Barker, M., Lenihan, P., Nair R., & Richards, C. (2012). Guidelines for psychologists working therapeutically with sexual and gender minority clients. Leicester: British Psychological Society.
 Attwood, F., Bale, C. & Barker, M. (Eds.) (2013). The Sexualization Report. Funded by The Wellcome Trust.
 Barker, M-J. (2017). BACP Good Practice in Action Fact Sheet 095: Gender, Sexual, and Relationship Diversity (GSRD). London: British Association of Counselling & Psychotherapy.

Selected articles and book chapters
 Barker, M. (2005). This is my partner, and this is my... partner's partner: Constructing a polyamorous identity in a monogamous world.Journal of Constructivist Psychology 18: 75–88.
 Ritchie, A. & Barker, M. (2006). ‘There aren’t words for what we do or how we feel so we have to make them up’: Constructing polyamorous languages in a culture of compulsory monogamy. Sexualities 9: 584–601.
 Barker, M. (2007). Heteronormativity and the exclusion of bisexuality in psychology. In V. Clarke & E. Peel (Eds.) Out in Psychology: Lesbian, Gay, Bisexual, Trans and Queer Perspectives. pp. 95–117. Chichester: Wiley
 Barker, M. & Langdridge, D. (2010). Whatever happened to non-monogamies? Critical reflections on recent research and theory. Sexualities 13: 748–772.

Journal editorships
Psychology & Sexuality. Taylor & Francis ISSN 1941-9899

References

External links
 
 Critical Sexology website

1974 births
Living people
20th-century British writers
21st-century British writers
Alumni of the University of Nottingham
Alumni of the University of Sheffield
Academics of the Open University
British psychologists
Existential therapists
Sex educators
Non-binary writers
People from Kingston upon Hull
LGBT psychologists